Eidson may refer to:

Places
Eidson, Tennessee
Eidson Road, Texas

People
Chuck Eidson (born 1980), American basketball player
Jake Eidson (b. 1995), American-Australian race car driver
Jim Eidson (born 1949), American football player in the National Football League
Michael Eidson, founder of CamelBak
Thomas Eidson (born 1944), American writer

English-language surnames
Disambiguation pages with surname-holder lists